Shane Harris is an American journalist and author. He is a senior national security writer at the Washington Post. He specializes in coverage of America's intelligence agencies. He is author of the books The Watchers: The Rise of America's Surveillance State and @War: The Rise of the Military-Internet Complex, about the impact of cyberspace as the American military's "fifth-domain" of war.

Harris is currently an ASU Future of War Fellow at New America Foundation.
He is also a co-host of the Rational Security podcast.

Career 
Shane Harris joined the Washington Post on December 22, 2017, after having joined the Wall Street Journal in May 2017.  Prior to working for the Wall Street Journal, Harris was the Senior Intelligence and National Security Correspondent for the Daily Beast in 2014 and as a subsequent contributor, a senior writer for Foreign Policy magazine, a senior contributor for The Washingtonian, and a staff correspondent at National Journal from 2005-2010.

Political views 
Harris is known to be a strong opponent of the worldwide mass surveillance activities of the U.S. National Security Agency (NSA). In an interview with TIME magazine, Harris said that "We've crossed into this era where surveillance and surveillance capabilities in the government are just a reality", and expressed doubt that the United States Congress will limit the practice of mass surveillance in the United States.

Journalism honours
In 2010, Harris received the 24th annual Gerald R. Ford Prize for "Distinguished Reporting on National Defense". In 2019, Harris and others at the Washington Post were finalists for the Pulitzer Prize for Public Service for their coverage of the assassination of Jamal Khashoggi by Saudi Arabia's Crown Prince Mohammed bin Salman.

Books 

Harris is the author of The Watchers: The Rise of America's Surveillance State, which won the Helen Bernstein Book Award for Excellence in Journalism in 2011. The Economist described the book as a "vivid, well-reported and intellectually sophisticated account of the surveillance state", and named it as one of several "Books of the Year" (2010).  He is also the author of @War: The Rise of the Military-Internet Complex, which Lawfare described as, superb, noting that, "Few books on a subject as technical as network security can be fairly described as riveting, but Harris has managed to pull off a rare feat: a story that is simultaneously rigorous, comprehensive, and a joy to read".

See also 
 Glenn Greenwald
 James Bamford

References

External links

Living people
Year of birth missing (living people)
American male non-fiction writers
American historians of espionage
21st-century American historians
21st-century American male writers
American male journalists
The Washington Post people